Hawayein  is a 2003 Indian film, directed by Amitoj Mann who also stars in the film along with Babbu Mann and Mahi Gill. The film is based on the 1984 anti-Sikh riots and its aftermath.

Plot
Hawayein is a film which emerges from the consequences of the Operation Blue Star and is based on the aftermath of India's Prime Minister, Indira Gandhi's assassination in 1984 – the 1984 anti-Sikh riots in Delhi and other places in India, and the subsequent victimization of the people of Punjab in the years that followed. This film depicts real life events and most of the situations shown are authentic seen through the eyes of the "Sarabjeet". It is the story of his journey from innocence to disillusionment, from being a simple, music loving student to becoming one of the most wanted militants in the country.  This film is an honest exploration of the reasons which led to the angst of the youth of Punjab and the turmoils suffered by their families.

Cast
 Ammtoje Mann as Sarabjeet
 Babbu Mann as Kanpuria
 Mukul Dev
 Tom Alter
 Mukesh Tiwari
 Sardar Sohi
 Kamini Kaushal
 Kulbhushan Kharbanda
 Mahi Gill
 Gursahib Singh Cheema
 Rama Vij
 Anandee Tripathi as muskan

Track listing

References

External links 
 

2003 films
2000s Hindi-language films
Films about massacres of Sikhs
Films based on 1984 anti-Sikh riots
Insurgency in Punjab in fiction
Fictional portrayals of the Delhi Police
Fictional portrayals of the Punjab Police (India)
Films set in Delhi
Films set in Punjab, India